Codie Benjamin William Rohrbaugh (born November 12, 1993) is an American professional stock car racing driver and team owner. He competes part-time in the NASCAR Craftsman Truck Series, driving the No. 97 Chevrolet Silverado for his family team, CR7 Motorsports. He also has competed in the ARCA Menards Series in the past.

Racing career
Rohrbaugh made his NASCAR debut in what was then known as the K&N East Series in 2014, where he ran three races in his No. 05 Toyota. He would return to the series part-time in 2015 and 2016.

Rohrbaugh began racing in ARCA in 2016, running two races in the No. 7 Chevrolet for his own team, Grant County Mulch Racing. He would later run eight races both in 2017 and 2018.

Rohrbaugh made his Truck Series debut in 2018, driving the No. 9 Chevrolet Silverado for Grant County Mulch Racing at Bristol. He started 25th and finished 16th.

In 2019, Rohrbaugh returned to the Truck Series, attempting a total of twelve races. He failed to qualify for his first two races at Daytona and Martinsville before qualifying at Texas in March, where he started 19th and finished 23rd. He recorded his first career top ten at Martinsville.

In the 2020 season opener at Daytona, Rohrbaugh avoided wrecks en route to a career-best third-place finish; he had finished three-wide with race winner Grant Enfinger and runner-up Jordan Anderson. His next top ten was a sixth-place finish at Richmond Raceway in September.

Motorsports career results

NASCAR
(key) (Bold – Pole position awarded by qualifying time. Italics – Pole position earned by points standings or practice time. * – Most laps led.)

Craftsman Truck Series

 Season still in progress
 Ineligible for series points

K&N Pro Series East

ARCA Menards Series
(key) (Bold – Pole position awarded by qualifying time. Italics – Pole position earned by points standings or practice time. * – Most laps led.)

References

External links
 

Living people
1993 births
NASCAR drivers
ARCA Menards Series drivers
Racing drivers from West Virginia
People from Petersburg, West Virginia